The 2016 ADAC Formula 4 season was the second season of the ADAC Formula 4. It began on 16 April at Oschersleben and finished on 2 October at Hockenheim after seven triple header rounds.

Teams and drivers

Race calendar
All rounds were part of the ADAC GT Masters weekends, with the exception of round 4 which supported the TCR International Series.

Championship standings

Points were awarded to the top 10 classified finishers in each race. No points were awarded for pole position or fastest lap.

For the third race in Zandvoort, only half points were awarded because of a premature crash.

Drivers' Championship

Rookies' championship

Teams' championship

References

External links
 

ADAC Formula 4 seasons
ADAC
ADAC Formula 4
ADAC F4